Anita Sidén (born 25 January 1940) is a Swedish politician of the Moderate Party. She remained the member of the Riksdag from 1998 to 2006.

External links
Anita Sidén at the Riksdag website

Members of the Riksdag from the Moderate Party
Living people
1940 births
Women members of the Riksdag
Members of the Riksdag 1998–2002
Members of the Riksdag 2002–2006
21st-century Swedish women politicians
Place of birth missing (living people)